Kahama United is a Tanzanian football club based in Shinyanga. Their home games are played at Kambarage Stadium.

References 

Football clubs in Tanzania